The International Lesbian Information Service (ILIS) was an international organization which aimed at fostering international lesbian organizing. It was started within ILGA in 1980. The following year, at a separate lesbian conference arranged prior to the ILGA Turin conference, lesbian organizations decided that ILIS should become a separate organization.

History 
ILIS arranged eleven international conferences in Europe, and supported lesbian conferences in Latin America and Asia through their regional networks (the Latin America Network and the Asian Lesbian Network).

In Turin in 1981, criticism concerning the lack of visibility of lesbians in the gay movement, as well as the cost of participation for lesbian activist to the ILGA conferences led to the separation of ILIS from ILGA. Paola Bachetta recalls leaving ILGA to form ILIS also in reaction to the lack of inclusivity towards postcolonial issues. Subsequently, the following ILIS conferences included intersectional workshops on racism, lesbophobia and postcolonial issues. 

ILIS was represented at the 1985 United Conference on the status of women, as a result of the decision to reach out to non western lesbians. In 1986, the ILIS Geneva conference fundraised money to strive towards the participation of lesbians coming from postcolonial countries. One of the main topic of the conference was "Political Exile for Lesbians of All Countries". The following conferences had to face some criticism about unchallenged assumptions: the fact that the conferences were ment for outed lesbians and did not take into consideration others types of lesbian expressions under oppressive regimes, and the fact that western countries were presented as saviors to third world countries.

The activities seem to have gradually stopped in the late 1990s, with their final newsletter being published in 1998.

The ILIS Secretariat, which also coordinated the publishing of regular newsletters, rotated as follows:
 Amsterdam 1980–81. Coordinated by Interpot. Published the ILIS cheap stencil service.
 Helsinki 1981–1983. Eva Isaksson published the ILIS Newsletter and ILIS conference papers.
 Oslo 1984. Published the ILIS Newsletter.
 Geneva 1985–86. Coordinated by Vanille-Fraise. Published the ILIS Bulletin under .
 Amsterdam 1987–1998. Coordinated by Interpot. Published the ILIS Newsletter.

Conferences 

Below are listed the international lesbian conferences organised by ILIS in Europe in conjunction with local lesbian organisations, the presence of ILIS representatives at three UN World Conferences on Women, as well as the Latin American and Asian Lesbian Conferences that were organised either with the help of ILIS or to which ILIS member groups attended:

 1980: 5–6 April – Creation of ILIS at IGA (now ILGA) Barcelona Conference, Spain
 1980: 14–30 July – ILIS at UN World Conference on Women in Copenhagen, Denmark
 1980: 27–31 December – ILIS Conference in Amsterdam, the Netherlands
 1981: 15–17 April – ILIS Conference in Turin, Italy (ILIS separates from IGA)
 30 December 1981 – 3 January 1982: ILIS Conference in Lichtaart, Belgium
 1982: 3–5 September – ILIS Conference in Sheffield, England
 1983: 1–4 April – ILIS Conference in Paris, France
 30 December 1983 – 1 January 1984: ILIS International Action Meeting in Amsterdam, the Netherlands
 1984: 19–23 April – ILIS Conference in Stockholm, Sweden
 1985: 4–8 April – ILIS Conference in Cologne, Germany
 1985: 15–26 July – ILIS at UN World Conference on Women in Nairobi, Kenya
 1986: 25–28 March – ILIS Conference in Geneva, Switzerland. Creation of Latin American and Asian regional networks.
 1987: 14–16 October – First meeting of Latin American, Caribbean and Chicana Lesbian Feminists in Mexico City, Mexico
 1988: 18–22 August – ILIS European Regional Conference in Amsterdam, the Netherlands
 1988: 2 October – Creation of ILIS Asia Subgroup, based in Amsterdam
 December 1988 – March 1989: Creation of ILIS Latin America Subgroup, based in Amsterdam
 1990: 18–22 January – ILIS Conference in Ljubljana, Yugoslavia (conflicting sources as to this conference taking place)*
 1990: 11–13 April – Second Latin American Conference in Costa Rica
 1990: 7–10 December – First Asian Lesbian Network (ALN) Conference in Bangkok, Thailand
 1991: 21–25 March – ILIS Conference in Barcelona, Spain
 1991: 28 August – First ILIS Zami Subgroup meeting in Amsterdam, the Netherlands
 1992: 3–5 May – Second ALN Conference in Tokyo, Japan
 1992: 14–16 August – Third Latin American Conference in Puerto Rico
 1995: 11–15 August – Third ALN Conference in Wulai, Taiwan
 1995: 4–15 September – ILIS at UN World Conference on Women in Beijing, China
 1998: Final ILIS Newsletter

See also

Asian Lesbian Network
European Lesbian* Conference
List of LGBT rights organizations

References

Bibliographic references
Anderson, Shelley, Lesbian rights are human rights! Amsterdam: ILIS, 1995.
Blasius, Mark (2001), Sexual Identities, Queer Politics. Princeton: Princeton University Press
Compare EEIP report 1990. "HOSI Ausland EEIP Reports Regional konferenzen" with ILIS (misc.) Open Up pdf hardcopy *1058*. Both digitally available at IHLIA LGBT Heritage.* http://www.ihlia.nl/ 
ILIS newsletters and minutes of meetings. Available at IHLIA LGBT Heritage.
Zimmerman, Bonnie (2012). Lesbian Histories and Cultures: An Encyclopedia, Volume I. New York: Routledge.

External links
IHLIA

International LGBT political advocacy groups
Lesbian organizations
Organizations established in 1980